The Ashuwillticook Rail Trail is a rail trail built on a former railroad corridor that runs parallel to Route 8 through the towns of Cheshire, Lanesborough and Adams, and into the city of Pittsfield, Massachusetts. It is a multi-use trail for biking, walking, roller-blading, and jogging. The trail is managed by the Massachusetts Department of Conservation and Recreation (DCR). Its first two phases opened in 2001 and 2004, with a 1.2-mile northerly extension added in 2017. A  extension, which runs South from the old Berkshire Mall to Crane Ave, opened in the spring of 2022.

The Ashuwillticook Rail Trail passes through the Hoosac River Valley, between Mount Greylock and the Hoosac Mountains. Cheshire Reservoir, the Hoosic River, and associated wetland communities flank much of the trail. The word Ashuwillticook (ash-oo-will-ti-cook) is from the American Indian name for the south branch of the Hoosic River and literally means “at the in-between pleasant river,” or in common tongue, “the pleasant river in between the hills.”

History
Built during the industrial boom of the 1800s, the railway proved to be a vital commercial link from the Atlantic Seaboard to communities which would have otherwise been isolated in the Berkshire Hills.

In 1845, the Pittsfield and North Adams Railroad developed this corridor with the goal of extending the Housatonic Railroad north to Rutland, Vermont. While the track was under construction, the company was acquired by the Western Railroad, which later became part of the Boston and Albany Railroad (B&A), as their North Adams Branch. Mineral traffic developed on the line and a number of limestone operations went into business. The New York Central Railroad took over the B&A in 1900, and upgraded the line, which was sold to the Boston and Maine Corporation (B&M) in 1981. As a connection to an existing track in North Adams, B&M operated the line until 1990.

References

External links 

Ashuwillticook Rail Trail Rails To Trails Conservancy/Trail Link

Rail trails in Massachusetts
State parks of Massachusetts
Parks in Berkshire County, Massachusetts
Lanesborough, Massachusetts
Adams, Massachusetts
Sports in Berkshire County, Massachusetts
Pittsfield, Massachusetts